The 2013 UCI Mountain Bike World Cup included three disciplines: cross-country, cross-country eliminator and downhill.

Cross-country

Cross-country Eliminator

Downhill

See also
2013 UCI Mountain Bike & Trials World Championships

References

https://web.archive.org/web/20140523092943/http://www.uci.ch/templates/BUILTIN-NOFRAMES/Template3/layout.asp?MenuId=MTUyMTM&LangId=1

External links
 UCI Homepage
 2013 UCI Mountain Bike World Cup Calendar

UCI Mountain Bike World Cup
Mountain Bike World Cup